R. R. "Roy" van Aalst (born 28 March 1983) is a Dutch politician. He has been a member of the House of Representatives representing the Party for Freedom since 23 March 2017 and a member of the States of Overijssel since March 2015. Van Aalst is married, has three children, and lives in Hengelo.

References

External links
 

1983 births
21st-century Dutch politicians
Living people
Members of the House of Representatives (Netherlands)
Members of the Provincial Council of Overijssel
Party for Freedom politicians
People from Enschede